Trick Bag is a 1976 album by the Meters. 

Trick Bag may also refer to:

"Trick Bag", an Earl King single covered on the aforementioned album and for which it is named
"Trick Bag", a song by Don Patterson from the 1966 album Goin' Down Home
Trick bag, another name for mojo bag in Mojo (African-American culture)

See also
Bag of Tricks